Pascual Bravo Echeverrí (July 2, 1838 - January 4, 1864) Was a Colombian politician and military man. He was President of the Sovereign State of Antioquia from 1863 to 1864.
He studied in Medellín and Sonsón, standing out early as a writer. After finishing high school, he moved to Rionegro to alternate between his agricultural businesses and the study of economics and law. He was part of the Liberal Party and defended his proposals and opposition to the government of Mariano Ospina Rodríguez, from the press ; In April 1861 he joined the Liberal army that invaded Antioquia, but was captured by the Conservatives in June of the same year.

References

1838 births
1864 deaths